Patricia Islands are three small islands  southwest of Austnes Point in the west part of Edward VIII Bay. Discovered and named in February 1936 by DI personnel on the William Scoresby. The islands were mapped in greater detail by Norwegian cartographers from air photos taken by the Lars Christensen Expedition, 1936–37. They were visited by an ANARE (Australian National Antarctic Research Expeditions) party under R.G. Dovers in 1954.

See also 
 List of Antarctic and sub-Antarctic islands

Islands of Kemp Land